Bécassine is a 1940 French comedy film directed by Pierre Caron and starring Max Dearly, Paulette Dubost and Marguerite Deval. It is an adaptation of the French comic series Bécassine.

Cast
 Paulette Dubost - Bécassine
 Max Dearly - Monsieur Proey-Minans
 Marguerite Deval - Madame Tampico
 Marcel Vallée - L'oncle
 Annie France - Annie de Grand-Air
 Alice Tissot - La marquise de Grand-Air
 Nita Raya - Arlette
 Daniel Clérice - José Tampico

See also
Bécassine (2018)

External links

1940 films
1940 comedy films
1940s French-language films
Films based on French comics
Films directed by Pierre Caron
Live-action films based on comics
French black-and-white films
French comedy films
1940s French films